Lewis Sayre Van Duzer (1861 – March 28, 1936) was a United States Navy officer.

Born in Elmira, New York, he graduated from the United States Naval Academy in 1880 and retired in 1914 with the rank of captain. During the Spanish–American War he participated as an officer aboard the USS Iowa in the Battle of Santiago de Cuba. He later was posted to the Philippines and China, and was an instructor in ordnance at the Naval Academy.  From 1910 to 1913, he was commander of the Brooklyn Navy Yard, and finally was captain of the USS Utah from 1913 until his retirement in 1914.

He died in Horseheads, New York.

During his career, he received several medals. He was the editor of the Army and Navy Year Book in 1895 and 1896.

External links

 New York Times obituary, March 29, 1936 (subscription required)

1861 births
1936 deaths
American book editors
American people of Dutch descent
People from Elmira, New York
American military personnel of the Spanish–American War
United States Navy officers